Pyncostola sciopola is a moth of the family Gelechiidae. It was described by Edward Meyrick in 1904. It is found in Australia, where it has been recorded from New South Wales.

The forewings are grey, irrorated (sprinkled) with dark fuscous. The plical and second discal stigmata are black. The hindwings are light grey.

References

Moths described in 1904
Pyncostola